Elysian Fields High School is a public high school located in Elysian Fields, Texas (USA). It is part of the Elysian Fields Independent School District located in southeastern Harrison County. Students also attend from the community of DeBerry and portions of northeastern Panola County  In 2011, the school was rated "Academically Acceptable" by the Texas Education Agency.

Elysian Fields High was known in the 1980s for its strong athletic, forestry, and One-Act Play programs.

Athletics
The Elysian Fields Yellowjackets compete in the following sports:

Baseball
Basketball
Cross Country
Football
Golf
Powerlifting
Softball
Tennis
Track and Field
Volleyball

State Titles
Softball 
2005(2A)

State Finalist  
Baseball
2001(2A), 
Football 
1998(2A/D2), 1999(2A/D2), 2007(2A/D2), 
Softball
2006(2A)

State Semi-Finals: Football - 2012(2A)

References

External links
Elysian Fields High School
Elysian Fields ISD
GreatSchools entry for Elysian Fields HS

Schools in Harrison County, Texas
Public high schools in Texas